Tantalum(V) iodide is the inorganic compound with the formula Ta2I10. Its name comes from the compound's empirical formula, TaI5.  It is a diamagnetic, black solid that hydrolyses readily.  The compound adopts an edge-shared bioctahedral structure, which means that two TaI5 units are joined by a pair of iodide bridges. There is no bond between the Ta centres.  Niobium(V) chloride, niobium(V) bromide, niobium(V) iodide, tantalum(V) chloride, and tantalum(V) bromide all share this structural motif.

Synthesis and structure
Tantalum pentaiodide forms from the reaction of tantalum pentoxide with aluminium triiodide:
3 Ta2O5  + 10 AlI3  →  6 TaI5  +  5 Al2O3

References

Iodides
Tantalum compounds
Metal halides